Colopsus is a genus of Asian jumping spiders first described by Eugène Louis Simon in 1902. It was synonymized with Evarcha in 1984, but the name was revalidated in 2021. It is a senior synonym of Cheliceroides.

Species
 it contains six species:
C. cancellatus Simon, 1902 (type) – Sri Lanka
C. cinereus Kanesharatnam & Benjamin, 2021 – India, Sri Lanka
C. ferruginus Kanesharatnam & Benjamin, 2021 – Sri Lanka
C. longipalpis (Żabka, 1985) – China, Vietnam
C. magnus Kanesharatnam & Benjamin, 2021 – Sri Lanka
C. tenuesi Kanesharatnam & Benjamin, 2021 – Sri Lanka

See also
 Evarcha
 List of Salticidae genera

References

Further reading

Salticidae genera
Taxa named by Eugène Simon
Spiders of Asia